The following is a timeline of the history of the city of Libreville, Gabon.

19th century

 1843 - Fort and trading post established by French.
 1849
 Libreville founded by French military official Édouard Bouët-Willaumez. Freed  slaves were resettled in the new village.
 M. Mountier, a resettled former slave, becomes mayor (approximate date).
 1860 - Town becomes administrative seat of colonial "French territories in the Gulf of Guinea" (approximate date).
 1865 - Church of the Immaculate Conception built.
 1888 - Libreville becomes administrative seat of colonial French Congo.

20th century
 1904 - Administrative seat of colonial Congo Gabon moves from Libreville to Brazzaville.
 1909 - Urban perimeter established.
 1910 - Libreville becomes part of colonial French Equatorial Africa.
 1940 - Roads built to Kango, Lambarene, and Owendo (approximate date).
 1946 - Lumber processing factory built.
 1955
 Libreville attains commune status.
 Roman Catholic diocese of Libreville established.
 1956 - Léon M'ba becomes mayor.
 1958 -  built.
 1959 - Radiodiffusion-Télévision Gabonaise headquartered in city.
 1960 - City becomes capital of the Republic of Gabon.
 1964
 March: 1964 United States Embassy in Libreville bombings occur.
 Deepwater port opens in Owendo.
 Population: 45,909 urban agglomeration.
 1968 - Leon Mebiame Mba becomes mayor.
 1970 - National University of Gabon established.
 1974 -  newspaper begins publication.
 1976
 June–July: Central African Games held in city.
 Ntoutoume Obame appointed mayor.
 1977 - July: Organisation of African Unity meeting held in Libreville.
 1980 - Population: 185,000.
 1981 - December: Anti-government protest.
 1983
 Centre International des Civilisations Bantu headquartered in city.
 Jean Aveno Davin appointed mayor.
 1989
 Cleaude Damas Ozimo appointed mayor.
 Meeting of the Association Internationale des Maires Francophones held in city.
 1993
 27 April: 1993 Zambia national football team plane crash occurs.
 Population: 420,000 (38% Fang, 28% Shira Punu, 12% Nzebi).
 1994 - Centre Culturel Français opens.(fr)
 1996 - Mayoral election established per Decentralisation Law. 
 1997 - Paul Mba Abessole becomes mayor.

21st century

 2005 - November: Post-election unrest.
 2006 - Population: 600,000 (approximate).
 2008 - April: Gabonese local elections, 2008 held; Jean-François Ntoutoume Emane becomes mayor.
 2010 - Akanda FC (football club) formed.
 2011
  headquartered in city.
 Stade d'Angondjé (stadium) opens.
 2012 - 12 February: 2012 Africa Cup of Nations Final (football contest) held in Libreville.
 2013 - Population: 703,939 urban agglomeration.
 2014 - Rose Christiane Ossouka Raponda becomes mayor.
 2016 - 31 August: Post-election protest begins.
 2017 - 5 February: 2017 Africa Cup of Nations Final held in Libreville.

See also
 Libreville history
 Chronology of Gabon

References

This article incorporates information from the French Wikipedia.

Bibliography

in English
 
 
  (about Cape Town, Johannesburg, Libreville, Lomé)
 
 
in French

External links

  (Bibliography of open access  articles)
 Items related to Libreville, various dates (via Europeana) (Images, etc.)
 Items related to Libreville, various dates (via Digital Public Library of America) (Images, etc.)
  (Bibliography)
  (Bibliography)
  (Bibliography)
 

Libreville
Libreville
History of Gabon
Years in Gabon
Gabon history-related lists
Libreville